Bethel Township is the name of some places in the U.S. state of Pennsylvania:
 Bethel Township, Armstrong County, Pennsylvania
 Bethel Township, Berks County, Pennsylvania
 Bethel Township, Delaware County, Pennsylvania
 Bethel Township, Fulton County, Pennsylvania
 Bethel Township, Lebanon County, Pennsylvania

See also 
 Lower Mount Bethel Township, Northampton County, Pennsylvania
 Upper Mount Bethel Township, Northampton County, Pennsylvania

Pennsylvania township disambiguation pages